Orretherium (meaning "Five teeth beast"; in part from the Aonikenk language) is a genus of mesungulatid mammal that lived in South America (Chile) during the Late Cretaceous period in what is now the Dorotea Formation.

References

Prehistoric mammal genera
Campanian life
Maastrichtian life
Cretaceous mammals of South America
Late Cretaceous tetrapods of South America
Cretaceous Chile
Fossils of Chile
 
Fossil taxa described in 2021
Dryolestida